Machhianwala railway station is located in Vehari District, Punjab, Pakistan.

See also
 List of railway stations in Pakistan
 Pakistan Railway

References

External links

Railway stations in Vehari District
Railway stations on Lodhran–Raiwind Line